In mathematics, the binary tetrahedral group, denoted 2T or , is a certain nonabelian group of order 24. It is an extension of the tetrahedral group T or (2,3,3) of order 12 by a cyclic group of order 2, and is the preimage of the tetrahedral group under the 2:1 covering homomorphism Spin(3) → SO(3) of the special orthogonal group by the spin group. It follows that the binary tetrahedral group is a discrete subgroup of Spin(3) of order 24.

The binary tetrahedral group is most easily described concretely as a discrete subgroup of the unit quaternions, under the isomorphism , where Sp(1) is the multiplicative group of unit quaternions. (For a description of this homomorphism see the article on quaternions and spatial rotations.)

Elements

Explicitly, the binary tetrahedral group is given as the group of units in the ring of Hurwitz integers. There are 24 such units given by

with all possible sign combinations.

All 24 units have absolute value 1 and therefore lie in the unit quaternion group Sp(1). The convex hull of these 24 elements in 4-dimensional space form a convex regular 4-polytope called the 24-cell.

Properties

The binary tetrahedral group, denoted by 2T, fits into the short exact sequence

This sequence does not split, meaning that 2T is not a semidirect product of {±1} by T. In fact, there is no subgroup of 2T isomorphic to T.

The binary tetrahedral group is the covering group of the tetrahedral group. Thinking of the tetrahedral group as the alternating group on four letters, we thus have the binary tetrahedral group as the covering group, 

The center of 2T is the subgroup {±1}. The inner automorphism group is isomorphic to A4, and the full automorphism group is isomorphic to S4.

The binary tetrahedral group can be written as a semidirect product

The group Z3 acts on the normal subgroup Q by conjugation.

One can show that the binary tetrahedral group is isomorphic to the special linear group SL(2,3) – the group of all  matrices over the finite field F3 with unit determinant, with this isomorphism covering the isomorphism of the projective special linear group PSL(2,3) with the alternating group A4.

Presentation

The group 2T has a presentation given by

or equivalently,

Generators with these relations are given by

Subgroups

The quaternion group consisting of the 8 Lipschitz units forms a normal subgroup of 2T of index 3. This group and the center {±1} are the only nontrivial normal subgroups.

All other subgroups of 2T are cyclic groups generated by the various elements, with orders 3, 4, and 6.

Higher dimensions
Just as the tetrahedral group generalizes to the rotational symmetry group of the n-simplex (as a subgroup of SO(n)), there is a corresponding higher binary group which is a 2-fold cover, coming from the cover Spin(n) → SO(n).

The rotational symmetry group of the n-simplex can be considered as the alternating group on n + 1 points, An+1, and the corresponding binary group is a 2-fold covering group. For all higher dimensions except A6 and A7 (corresponding to the 5-dimensional and 6-dimensional simplexes), this binary group is the covering group (maximal cover) and is superperfect, but for dimensional 5 and 6 there is an additional exceptional 3-fold cover, and the binary groups are not superperfect.

Usage in theoretical physics

The binary tetrahedral group was used in the context of Yang–Mills theory in 1956 by Chen Ning Yang and others.
It was first used in flavor physics model building by Paul Frampton and Thomas Kephart in 1994.
In 2012 it was shown  that a relation between two neutrino mixing angles,
derived

by using this binary tetrahedral flavor symmetry, agrees with experiment.

See also
Binary polyhedral group
Binary cyclic group, ⟨n⟩, order 2n
Binary dihedral group, ⟨2,2,n⟩, order 4n
Binary octahedral group, 2O = ⟨2,3,4⟩, order 48
Binary icosahedral group, 2I = ⟨2,3,5⟩, order 120

Notes

References

 6.5 The binary polyhedral groups, p. 68

Tetrahedral